Pablo Vázquez may refer to:
Pablo Vázquez (footballer, born 1984), Argentine footballer
Pablo Vázquez Pérez (born 1994), Spanish footballer
Pablo Lucio Vasquez (1977-2016), American murderer